Maxwell Joseph Quackenbush (August 29, 1928 — April 17, 2020) was a Canadian professional ice hockey player who played 61 games in the National Hockey League for the Chicago Black Hawks and Boston Bruins between 1950 and 1951. The rest of his career, which lasted from 1947 to 1955, was spent in the minor leagues. He was the younger brother of Bill Quackenbush. In his post-hockey career, he served with the Metropolitan Toronto Police Force, and was known to many elementary school children in the '60s and '70s as "Constable Quackenbush", instructing them on traffic safety in partnership with Elmer the Safety Elephant.

His son, Ross, played for the Canadian National Basketball team in the 1970s, and served as the head coach of the St. Mary's (Halifax) University basketball team for many year. Quackenbush died in Halifax in 2020; he had Alzheimer's disease in his later years.

Career statistics

Regular season and playoffs

References

External links
 

1928 births
2020 deaths
Boston Bruins players
Calgary Stampeders (WHL) players
Canadian ice hockey defencemen
Chicago Blackhawks players
Detroit Hettche players
Indianapolis Capitals players
Omaha Knights (USHL) players
St. Louis Flyers players
Ice hockey people from Toronto
Windsor Spitfires players